The Late Jurassic is the third epoch of the Jurassic Period, and it spans the geologic time from 163.5 ± 1.0 to 145.0 ± 0.8 million years ago (Ma), which is preserved in Upper Jurassic strata.

In European lithostratigraphy, the name "Malm" indicates rocks of Late Jurassic age. In the past, Malm was also used to indicate the unit of geological time, but this usage is now discouraged to make a clear distinction between lithostratigraphic and geochronologic/chronostratigraphic units.

Subdivisions
The Late Jurassic is divided into three ages, which correspond with the three (faunal) stages of Upper Jurassic rock:

Paleogeography

During the Late Jurassic Epoch, Pangaea broke up into two supercontinents, Laurasia to the north, and Gondwana to the south. The result of this break-up was the spawning of the Atlantic Ocean. However, at this time, the Atlantic Ocean was relatively narrow.

Life forms of the epoch
This epoch is well known for many famous types of dinosaurs, such as the sauropods, the theropods, the thyreophorans, and the ornithopods. Other animals, such as some crocodylomorphs and the first birds, appeared in the Jurassic. Listed here are only a few of the many Jurassic animals:

Camarasaurus, a large herbivorous sauropod dinosaur from North America
Apatosaurus, a large herbivorous sauropod dinosaur from North America
Brachiosaurus, a large herbivorous sauropod dinosaur from North America
Brontosaurus, a large herbivorous sauropod dinosaur from North America
Diplodocus, a large herbivorous sauropod dinosaur from North America
Barosaurus, a large herbivorous sauropod dinosaur from North America
Europasaurus, a small herbivorous sauropod dinosaur from Europe
Supersaurus, possibly the largest North American sauropod of them all
Dicraeosaurus, a large herbivorous sauropod dinosaur from Africa
Giraffatitan, another large sauropod from Africa (usually recognized as a species of Brachiosaurus)
Allosaurus, possibly the biggest Jurassic predator, the most common Late Jurassic theropod of North America, also present in Europe
Epanterias, one of the largest Jurassic carnivores, from North America (possibly just Allosaurus)
Torvosaurus, a large Jurassic carnivore, from North America and Europe
Ceratosaurus, a medium-sized Jurassic carnivore of North America, Europe, and possibly Africa
Compsognathus, a small theropod from Europe
Yangchuanosaurus, a large theropod from Asia
Tuojiangosaurus, a thyreophoran from Asia
Stegosaurus, a thyreophoran from North America and Europe
Dryosaurus, a North American ornithopod
Camptosaurus, an ornithopod from North America and possibly Europe
Gargoyleosaurus, a thyreophoran from North America
Archaeopteryx, the first known bird, from Europe
Rhamphorhynchus a long-tailed pterosaur from Europe
Pterodactylus, a short-tailed pterosaur from Europe.
Ophthalmosaurus, a very common sea-going ichthyosaur from what is now Europe and North America
Liopleurodon, a medium-sized sea-going pliosaur from what is now Europe
Perisphinctes, an ammonite

References

  
 

 
Geological epochs
Jurassic geochronology